Kieselbach may refer to:

 Kieselbach (Dorndorfer Bach), a river of Hesse, Germany
 Kieselbach (Lichte), a tributary of the Lichte in Thuringia, Germany